Miguel Silva Júnior (born 20 December 1948) is a former Brazilian cyclist. He competed in the individual road race at the 1972 Summer Olympics.

References

External links
 

1948 births
Living people
Sportspeople from São Paulo (state)
Brazilian male cyclists
Brazilian road racing cyclists
Olympic cyclists of Brazil
Cyclists at the 1972 Summer Olympics
20th-century Brazilian people
21st-century Brazilian people
People from Itanhaém